Anthony Comstock (March 7, 1844 – September 21, 1915) was an anti-vice activist, United States Postal Inspector, and secretary of the New York Society for the Suppression of Vice (NYSSV), who was dedicated to upholding Christian morality. He opposed obscene literature, abortion, contraception, gambling, prostitution, and patent medicine.

The terms "comstockery" and "comstockism" refer to his extensive censorship campaign of materials that he considered obscene, namely anything remotely discussing sex publicly, including birth control advertised or sent by mail. He used his positions in the U.S. Postal Service and the NYSSV (in association with the New York police) to make numerous arrests for obscenity and gambling.

Life and work
Comstock was born in New Canaan, Connecticut, the son of Polly Ann (née Lockwood) and Thomas Anthony Comstock. As a young man, he enlisted and fought for the Union in the American Civil War from December 1863 to September 1865. He served without incident in Company H, 17th Connecticut Infantry, but he objected to the profanity used by his fellow soldiers. 

In 1867, he moved to New York City, where he worked as a porter, a stock clerk, a wholesale dry goods salesman. He also worked for the Young Men's Christian Association in New York City. On March 5, 1873, he was appointed a special agent of the U.S. Postal Service, a position he held until January 1907.

Comstock lived in Summit, New Jersey, from 1880 to 1915. In 1892, he built a house at 35 Beekman Road, where he lived until his death there in 1915.

Efforts for censorship

Christian religiosity 

Motivated by first-hand experience with what he saw as a constant barrage of debauchery among fellow Union soldiers during the Civil War, when he gained power it was not long before Comstock aroused intense loathing from early civil liberties groups and strong support from church-based groups that were worried about public morals. Comstock, the self-styled "weeder in God's garden", arrested D. M. Bennett for publishing "An Open Letter to Jesus Christ" and later had the editor charged for mailing a free-love pamphlet. Bennett was prosecuted, subjected to a widely publicized trial, and imprisoned in the Albany Penitentiary.

During his career, Comstock made many and diverse enemies, such as Emma Goldman and Margaret Sanger. In her autobiography, Goldman referred to Comstock as the leader of America's "moral eunuchs." In later years his health was affected by a severe blow to the head from an anonymous attacker. He lectured to college audiences and wrote newspaper articles to sustain his causes. Before his death, Comstock attracted the interest of a young law student, J. Edgar Hoover, who showed interest in his causes and methods.

U.S. government services 
In 1873, Comstock created the New York Society for the Suppression of Vice, an institution dedicated to moral supervision of the American public. Later that year, Comstock successfully influenced the United States Congress to pass the Comstock Law, which made illegal the delivery by U.S. mail, or by other modes of transportation, of "obscene, lewd, or lascivious" material, as well as prohibiting any methods of production or publication of information pertaining to the procurement of abortion, the prevention of conception and the prevention of venereal disease.

Some of Comstock's ideas of what were "obscene, lewd, or lascivious" could be seen by many modern Westerners as quite broad; during his time of greatest power, some anatomy textbooks were prohibited from being sent to medical students by the United States Postal Service.

He was a savvy political insider in New York City and was made a special agent of the United States Postal Service with police-level powers, including the right to carry a weapon. With this power, he prosecuted those that he suspected of either public distribution of pornography or commercial fraud. He was also involved in shutting down the Louisiana Lottery, which was the only legal lottery in the United States at the time and was notorious for corruption.

Opposing suffragettes 
Comstock was also opposed to woman suffragists, notably Victoria Claflin Woodhull and her sister Tennessee Celeste Claflin. The men's journal The Days' Doings popularized images of the sisters for three years and was instructed by its editor (while Comstock was present) to stop producing lewd images. Comstock also took legal action against the paper for advertising contraceptives. After the sisters published an exposé of an adulterous affair between the Reverend Henry Ward Beecher and Elizabeth Tilton, he had the sisters arrested under laws forbidding the use of the postal service to distribute "obscene material", specifically citing a mangled quotation from the Bible that Comstock found obscene. They were later acquitted of the charges.

Less fortunate was Ida Craddock, who died by suicide on the eve of reporting to federal prison for distributing via the U.S. mail various sexually explicit marriage manuals that she had written. Her final work was a lengthy public suicide note specifically condemning Comstock.

Comstock also arrested the prominent abortion care provider Madame Restell. In 1878, he posed as a customer seeking birth control for his wife. Restell provided him with pills and he returned the next day with the police, and arrested her. Rather than face the resulting trial, she committed suicide soon after it began.

Destruction of books 
Through his various campaigns, he destroyed 15 tons of books, 284,000 pounds of plates for printing "objectionable" books, and nearly 4,000,000 pictures. He claimed that "books are feeders for brothels."

Comstock boasted that he was responsible for 4,000 arrests and claimed he drove 15 persons to suicide in his "fight for the young".

Death
On September 21, 1915, Comstock died of pneumonia at the age of 71 at his home in Summit, New Jersey. According to one obituary, Comstock left behind a large collection of pictures, prints, and other literature that he had seized during his career, "which is said to contain a sufficient amount of real pornographic material."

Works
 Frauds Exposed (1880)
 Traps for the Young (1883)
 Gambling Outrages (1887)
 Morals Versus Art (1887)

He wrote numerous magazine articles relating to similar subjects.

Legacy 
The term "comstockery", meaning "censorship because of perceived obscenity or immorality", was coined in an editorial in The New York Times in 1895. George Bernard Shaw used the term in 1905 after Comstock had alerted the New York City police to the content of Shaw's play Mrs. Warren's Profession. Shaw remarked that "Comstockery is the world's standing joke at the expense of the United States. Europe likes to hear of such things. It confirms the deep-seated conviction of the Old World that America is a provincial place, a second-rate country-town civilization after all." Comstock thought of Shaw as an "Irish smut dealer."

Biographies 
Anthony Comstock: Roundsman of the Lord by Heywood Broun and Margaret Leech of the Algonquin Round Table examines his personal history and his investigative, surveillance, and law enforcement techniques. It was written in 1927.

Lust on Trial: Censorship and the Rise of American Obscenity in the Age of Anthony Comstock presents a colorful journey through Comstock’s career that doubles as a new history of post–Civil War America’s risqué visual and sexual culture. It was written by Dr. Amy B. Werbel and published by Columbia University Press in 2018.

The Man Who Hated Women: Sex, Censorship, And Civil Liberties In The Gilded Age focuses on Comstock's impacts on society, the Comstock Laws, and eight women charged with violating the law. It was written by Amy Sohn and published by Farrar, Straus and Giroux in 2021.

See also

Birth control movement in the United States
Comstock Act
New York Society for the Suppression of Vice
Jack Thompson (activist)

References

Further reading
 .
 .
 .
 .
 .
 .

External links

 .

 .

1844 births
1915 deaths
19th-century American male writers
American anti-abortion activists
American political writers
American male non-fiction writers
Anti-contraception activists
Anti-pornography activists
Burials at the Cemetery of the Evergreens
Connecticut Republicans
Deaths from pneumonia in New Jersey
New Jersey Republicans
New York Society for the Suppression of Vice people
People from New Canaan, Connecticut
People of Connecticut in the American Civil War
Politicians from Summit, New Jersey
Union Army soldiers